The grammar of the Hittite language has a highly conservative verbal system and rich nominal declension. The language is attested in cuneiform, and is the earliest attested Indo-European language.

Basic noun and adjective declension 
The nominal system consists of the following cases: nominative, vocative, accusative, genitive, dative-locative, ablative, ergative, allative, and instrumental, and distinguishes between two numbers (singular and plural) and two genders, common (animate) and neuter (inanimate). The distinction between genders is fairly rudimentary, with a distinction generally being made only in the nominative case, and the same noun is sometimes attested in both genders.

The basic scheme of suffixation is given in the table below, which is valid for almost all nouns and adjectives. The sample word shown is antuhsa meaning "man".

Verb conjugation 
When compared with other early-attested Indo-European languages, such as Ancient Greek and Sanskrit, the verb system in Hittite is morphologically relatively uncomplicated. There are two general verbal classes according to which verbs are inflected, the mi-conjugation and the hi-conjugation. There are two voices (active and medio-passive), two moods (indicative and imperative), two aspects (perfective and imperfective), and two tenses (present and preterite).

Additionally, the verbal system displays two infinitive forms, one verbal substantive, a supine and a participle. Rose (2006) lists 132 hi-verbs and interprets the hi/mi oppositions as vestiges of a system of grammatical voice ("centripetal voice" vs. "centrifugal voice").

The basic conjugational endings are as follows:

The Set I endings are default; the Set II endings are taken primarily by monosyllabic Ablauting mi-verbs. Within Set I verbs, the Ib endings are taken by stems ending in -u.

Syntax 
Hittite is a head-final language, with it has subject-object-verb word order. It also has a split ergative alignment.

Hittite syntax shows one noteworthy feature that is typical of Anatolian languages: commonly, the beginning of a sentence or clause is composed of either a sentence-connecting particle or otherwise a fronted or topicalized form, and a "chain" of fixed-order clitics is then appended.

Literature

Dictionaries

Goetze, Albrecht (1954). Review of: Johannes Friedrich, Hethitisches Wörterbuch (Heidelberg: Winter). Language 30.401–405.
Sturtevant, Edgar H. (1931). Hittite glossary: words of known or conjectured meaning, with Sumerian ideograms and Accadian words common in Hittite texts. Language, Vol. 7, No. 2, pp. 3–82., Language Monograph No. 9.
Puhvel, Jaan (1984–). Hittite Etymological Dictionary. Berlin: Mouton.

Grammar

Sturtevant, Edgar H. A. (1933, 1951). Comparative Grammar of the Hittite Language. Rev. ed. New Haven: Yale University Press, 1951. First edition: 1933.
Sturtevant, Edgar H. A. (1940). The Indo-Hittite laryngeals. Baltimore: Linguistic Society of America.

Yakubovich, Ilya (2010). Sociolinguistics of the Luwian Language. Leiden: Brill.

Text editions

Goetze, Albrecht & Edgar H. Sturtevant (1938). The Hittite Ritual of Tunnawi. New Haven: American Oriental Society.
Sturtevant, Edgar H. A., & George Bechtel (1935). A Hittite Chrestomathy. Baltimore: Linguistic Society of America.

Journal articles

References

External links
Hittite in the wiki Glossing Ancient Languages (recommendations for the Interlinear Morphemic Glossing of Hittite texts)
 

grammar
Indo-European grammars